Orchard View Schools is a school district in Muskegon Township, Michigan, south of the Muskegon River in Muskegon County, Michigan. It is a member of the Muskegon Area Intermediate School District.

Schools
 Orchard View High School (grades 9 to 12, new building opened 2006)
 Orchard View Middle School (grades 6 to 8)
 Orchard View Cardinal Elementary (grades 2 to 5, at former high school)
 Orchard View Early Elementary - Gustafson Campus (grades pre-K to 1)

Community Education
As of fall 2007, Orchard View Community Education is housed in the former Orchard View Elementary building, now named Orchard View Community Education Center. Orchard View Elementary and Jolman Elementary merged at the old high school building.
 Adult Basic Education
 Adult Education
 Adult Enrichment and Leisure
 Business and Industry-Computers
 Child Care
 English as a Second Language
 Even Start
 GED Diploma
 Head Start
 Pre-School
 Senior Programs
 Trips and Tours - OV Travelers
 Workforce Development Program
 Youth Programs

References

External links
 Official site

School districts in Michigan
Education in Muskegon County, Michigan